The MMIST CQ-10A SnowGoose is a cargo delivery unmanned aerial vehicle that has reached IOC (Initial Operational Capability) with the United States Armed Forces with the delivery of 15 vehicles. The SnowGoose UAV is produced by the Canadian company Mist Mobility Integrated Systems Technology (MMIST). The SnowGoose UAV is an application of MMIST's Sherpa autonomous GPS-guided parafoil delivery system and is intended for pin-point delivery of small cargo items (ammunition, supplies) to special forces. A fully loaded Snowgoose can carry a total of 272 kg (600 lb).  The SnowGoose was originally designed for leaflet dispensing, but can support a variety of missions with its six modular cargo bays, each of which can carry pods for fuel (trading payload for range), cargo, or electronics (sensor or broadcasting) packages.

The CQ-10A uses a parafoil for lift; the CQ-10B uses an autogyro rotor for lift. The "B" version has twice the range of the "A" version. According to the manufacturer, the CQ-10B can carry 1088 kg (2400 lb) up to 150 km (93 mi) from a central base per day (24 h), placing the loads within 30 m (100 ft) of a predesignated point then performing near-vertical take-offs.

Variants

 CQ-10A Parafoil lift.
 CQ-10B Autogyro rotor lift with increased range. VSTOL.

Operators
 
 Canadian Forces - testing 2007
 
 United States Special Operations Command

Specifications
 Length 2.90 m (9 ft 6 in)
 Wing Span: 2.1 m (6 ft 8 in)
 Weight max: 635 kg (1400 lb); empty: 270 kg (600 lb) 
 Cargo weight max: 272 kg (600 lb) ("A" version) / (227 kg) (500 lb) ("B" version)
 Engine: Rotax 914 piston engine; 81 kW (110 hp)   
 Range: 300 km (160 nmi) (34 kg (75 lb) payload)("A" version) / 600 km (320 nmi) ("B" version)
 Endurance: 19 hrs 
 Speed: 61 km/h (38 mph)("A" version) / 120 km/h (75 mph ("B" version/ est.)
 Ceiling: >5500 m (18000 ft)

See also

References

External links
 DefenseLink - SnowGoose: UAVs Enter the Airlift Business
 MMIST CQ-10 SnowGoose - Directory of U.S. Military Rockets and Missiles

Aircraft manufactured in Canada
Autogyros
Parafoils
Single-engined pusher aircraft
Unmanned aerial vehicles of Canada
Unmanned aerial vehicles of the United States
Aircraft first flown in 2001
2000s United States military transport aircraft